George Waller VC (June 1827 – 10 January 1877) was an English recipient of the Victoria Cross, the highest and most prestigious award for gallantry in the face of the enemy that can be awarded to British and Commonwealth forces.

Details
Waller was about 30 years old, and a colour-sergeant in the 1st Battalion, 60th Rifles (later The King's Royal Rifle Corps),  British Army during the Indian Mutiny when the following deed took place at Delhi, British India for which he was awarded the VC.

The medal
His Victoria Cross is displayed at the Royal Green Jackets (Rifles) Museum, Winchester, England.

References

Location of grave and VC medal (West Sussex)

1827 births
1877 deaths
People from the Borough of Guildford
King's Royal Rifle Corps soldiers
British recipients of the Victoria Cross
Indian Rebellion of 1857 recipients of the Victoria Cross
British military personnel of the Second Anglo-Sikh War
British Army recipients of the Victoria Cross
Burials in Sussex
Military personnel from Guildford